The Shanghai Advanced Institute of Finance (SAIF) at Shanghai Jiao Tong University was established on April 19, 2009, with strategic and financial support from the Shanghai Municipal Government.

It offers the following programs:
Finance MBA: 2-year full-time program taught in English; 2-year part-time  program taught in English and Chinese.
Masters of Finance: 2-year Full-time program taught in English
Finance EMBA :2-year part-time program taught in Chinese
PhD in Finance
Executive Development Program (EDP): Non-degree short-term courses tailormade for financial institutions

External links 
official website: http://www.saif.sjtu.edu.cn/en

References 
 Programs in English @ Shanghai Jiao Tong University
 SAIF News @ BusinessBecause
 MBA Programs Worldwide @ Find MBA
 News report @  Capital IQ
 Testimonials @ University of Cambridge ESOL exams

Shanghai Jiao Tong University